FK Bor (Serbian Cyrillic: ФК Бор) is a football club based in Bor, Serbia.

History

Early Years (1920s to 1960s)
The club was founded in 1919 as a Serbian-French sports society under the name Association Sportive Bor (ASB). The club was financed by the French Society of the Bor Mines and managed by a Frenchman named Loren, the director of mechanical services in Bor mining company. Not much is recorded about the early club activity, until the first official game played in 1920. First ASB's head coach was Gallois, who also played for the club as well as for France national football team. ASB played only friendlies until early 1930s when it joined the Niš Football Subassociation where it played in the Timok Valley regional league with moderate success until the beginning of the Second World War.

At the beginning of the Second World War, the club was renamed BSK. This was the most successful club in the area of the Eastern Serbia and achieved good results in the Serbian football competitions during the war.

BSK and another local team Rudar merged in early 1945, to form a club with the name of Radnički. Next year, the club officially changed its name to FK Bor and was engaged in the first organized post-war competitions. Soon the prefix rudarski (meaning the miners) was added to the name and the club was known as RFK Bor until 1974, when it changed back to FK Bor.

Rise to Prominence (1960s and 1970s)
Victories over Radnički Niš by 7–0 and Radnički Kragujevac by 9–1 are good examples of some great exhibitions made in the '50s. Bor played in the Eastern Serbia regional leagues until 1963, when it qualified for the Yugoslav Second League by defeating FK Sloboda Užice in a 3-game playoff. In 1963–64, their first season in the national level, they finished 2nd behind FK Sutjeska Nikšić. FK Bor stayed in the Second League for five consecutive seasons.

The season 1967–68 was by far the best one in the club's history. Coached by Radojica Radojičić, Bor not only won the East Division of the 1967–68 Yugoslav Second League, therefore getting promotion to the top division, the Yugoslav First League, but it also reached the final of the 1967–68 Yugoslav Cup and qualified for the 1968–69 European Cup Winners' Cup. Goalkeeper Jovan Hajduković was voted the best player of the East Division of the Second League.

In the domestic cup campaign Bor achieved two major upsets. In the round of 16, they eliminated the top side FK Radnički Niš in an away match by 2–3, with two goals in the extra time. After eliminating FK Sloboda Tuzla in the quarter-finals, Bor was drawn with another top Yugoslav club, FK Vojvodina. Vojvodina, who were crowned Yugoslav Champions just one year ago, was a clear favorite to win the game. However, backed by some 10,000 home supporters, Bor pulled off a 2–1 victory and qualified for a final with Yugoslav and European powerhouse Red Star Belgrade.

The final was played on 22 May 1968 in Belgrade. Although Red Star won easily with 7–0 securing the Double, Bor earned the right to represent Yugoslavia in the next year's Cup Winners' Cup.

Originally, Bor was drawn against Union Berlin but after the East German clubs withdrew from the competition, they were drawn against the Czechoslovak side Slovan Bratislava. Slovan won 3–2 on aggregate and eventually won the 1968–69 European Cup Winners' Cup trophy.

Bor finished its first season in the top level at 13th place among 18 clubs. They were selected to represent Yugoslavia in the 1969 Balkans Cup – a minor international club competition for Balkan nations. They were eliminated in the group stage with Dinamo Tirana from Albania and Universitatea Craiova from Romania.

After three seasons in the top division they were relegated in 1971, but immediately bounced back, finishing the 1971–72 Second League in front of Priština and eliminating Rudar Ljubija and FK Crvenka in the playoffs. Bor played three more seasons in the Yugoslav First League until 1975. They reached the quarter-finals of the 1970–71 Yugoslav Cup where they were again defeated by the eventual winner Red Star Belgrade.

Bor played two more seasons in the Second League. After 14 consecutive years of playing in the national levels, they got relegated back to the Serbian Republic league (3rd level) in 1977. They were promoted back to the Second League after two seasons and in 1979–80 Yugoslav Second League nearly missed out the promotion back to the top national league. Before the last matchday up to 5 teams, including Bor, were contesting the first place. Eventually, after allegations of match fixing and an investigation by Yugoslav Football Association, OFK Beograd, Radnički Kragujevac and FK Bor all finished with 37 points, however, OFK Beograd was promoted due to the best goal-difference.

1980s and 1990s
The club played in the Second Yugoslav League with moderate success during the first half of the 80s. In 1986 they got relegated to the Serbian Republic League and, in the late 80s, a new third-level competition was formed - the Inter-Republic Leagues. Bor played alongside some solid teams from Serbia proper, Kosovo and Macedonia. In 1990 Bor won this league and promoted to the 1990–91 Yugoslav Second League. In 1992, SFR Yugoslavia collapsed, and Bor continued to play in the 1992–93 Second League of FR Yugoslavia with teams from Serbia and Montenegro but soon got relegated to the Serbian League East.

The club was always relying on RTB Bor for financing and the decline of copper production in the '90s due to the country's economic isolation took its toll on FK Bor as well. Bor saw its last period of playing in the national football level in the late 90s, playing in the Second League of Serbia and Montenegro between 1996 and 2001.

Financial struggles in recent years and lower league football (2000s and 2010s)
Over the last two decades, Bor has been struggling between Serbian League East and the Serbian Zone League (3rd and 4th competition level) even spending a season in the Bor District League (5th level). In 2012, while playing in the 4th league, the club changed its name to OFK Bor. In 2017, after relegation from the Zone League, club folded due to financial difficulties. The next year, they reorganised under the name FK Bor 1919 and they currently compete in Zone League East, the fourth-highest football league in Serbia.

Records and highlights
FK Bor played in the national Cup Finale in season 1967–68:

Yugoslav Cup Final: Red Star Belgrade – FK Bor 7:0 (1:0)
Highest League Position: 13 in First League
Lowest League Position: 16 in Pomoravlje-Timok Zone League
Highest Attendance: 20000 in UEFA Cup Winners' Cup R1 vs Slovan Bratislava
Biggest Win: 21–0 against BSK Bogovina in Spring 1960
Biggest Defeat: 13–0 against FK Tabane on 13 April 2016

Honours
Yugoslav Second League
Winners: 1967–68, 1971–72
Yugoslav Cup
Runners-up: 1967–68
Third League
Winners: 1962–63, 1979–80, 1989–90, 1995–96
Niš Zone League
Winners: 1960–61, 1961–62
Bor and Zaječar District Cup
Winners: 1935–36, 1936–37, 1938–39, 1995–96, 1996–97
Niš Football Association Cup
Winners: 1953–54
RTB trophy
Winners: 1957

FK Bor in Europe

FK Bor Supporters Player of the Year
 2009–10:  Marko Terzić

Managerial history

External links
Famous History of FK Bor 

 
Bor, Serbia
Football clubs in Yugoslavia
Association football clubs established in 1919
1919 establishments in Serbia